Pseudonicarete peyrierasi is a species of beetle in the family Cerambycidae, and the only species in the genus Pseudonicarete. It was described by Breuning in 1980.

References

Desmiphorini
Beetles described in 1980
Monotypic beetle genera